Benipur Multilateral High School is a secondary school in Shailkupa Upazila, Jhenaidah District. It was established in 1906.

This school has 2 academic (2 story) buildings, 1 student hostel, 1 mosque, and a library.

References

Educational institutions established in 1906
High schools in Bangladesh
Schools in Jhenaidah District
1906 establishments in India